Hobart Regional Airport  is three miles southeast of Hobart, in Kiowa County, Oklahoma, United States.

Facilities

References

External links 
 City of Hobart

Airports in Oklahoma
Buildings and structures in Kiowa County, Oklahoma